A provincial by-election was held in New Brunswick on March 5, 2007 to fill the vacancy in the Legislative Assembly riding of Moncton East.

As a result of Bernard Lord's resignation, a by-election had to be called within six months of January 31, 2007. The date was set for March 5, 2007.  The governing Liberals were hopeful that they could win the seat as it was held by Liberal Ray Frenette from 1974 to 1998 and because they are showing strength in recent opinion polls across the province.

Candidates

The Liberal leader, Premier Shawn Graham, said he would not interfere in the nomination process, leaving it up to the riding to determine a candidate but that, as he has only three women in his caucus, he added that he "will be actively searching for women to run".  Of the three candidates there were two men (Chris Collins, Daniel LeBlanc) and one woman (Gilberte Losier). Chris Collins, a Moncton city councillor, was nominated as the Liberal candidate.
Chad Peters, a staffer with the Conservative Party's legislative office, and a former Elvis impersonator, was nominated on February 10, 2007.
Hélène Lapointe, a former president of the New Brunswick New Democratic Party, was acclaimed her party's nominee on February 17, 2007.

Results

References 

2007 elections in Canada
New Brunswick by-election, 2007
Politics of Moncton
Provincial by-elections in New Brunswick